The 1992 UCLA Bruins football team represented the University of California, Los Angeles in the 1992 NCAA Division I-A football season.

Schedule

Roster

Season summary

USC

Barnes 16/28, 385 Yds
Stokes 6 Rec, 263 Yds

Awards and honors
 All-Americans: Carlton Gray (CB, consensus), Vaughn Parker (OT, second team)
 All-Conference First Team: Carlton Gray (CB), Vaughn Parker (OT)

References

UCLA
UCLA Bruins football seasons
UCLA Bruins football